Sokoľ is a village and municipality in Košice-okolie District in the Kosice Region of eastern Slovakia.

History
In historical records the village was first mentioned in 1270 (Zokola), when it belonged to master Reinhold. In the 13th century a castle existed in the hills near the village. It disappeared in 1430. the village passed to many landowners' families: in 1330 to Drugeth, in 1370 to Rozgonyi, in 1387 to Bebek and in 1423 to Palocsay. In 1429 it passed to Košice.

Geography
The village lies at an altitude of 250 metres and covers an area of 15.662 km². The municipality has a population of 880 people.

External links
http://www.statistics.sk/mosmis/eng/run.html
http://www.cassovia.sk/sokol/

Villages and municipalities in Košice-okolie District
Šariš